Matta Mughal Khel is a town and union council of Charsadda District in Khyber Pakhtunkhwa province of Pakistan. It is located at 34°16'47N 71°33'59E and has an altitude of 343 metres (1128 feet).

References 

Union councils of Charsadda District
Populated places in Charsadda District, Pakistan